Rem ( "to weep"), also Rem-Rem, Remi, or Remi the Weeper, who lives in Rem-Rem, the realm of weeping, was a fish god in Egypt who fertilized the land with his tears, producing both vegetation and the reptiles.  He is assumed to be the personification of Ra's tears.

References

Egyptian gods
Fish gods
Sky and weather gods